This list records voting results from delegates of the National People's Congress of China since 2006, when the official state media started to use text reporting live through the internet. Any other results before 2006 that are known are also listed.

Voting rules 
Source: Rules of Procedure for the National People's Congress of the People's Republic of China

Approval rates needed
Current delegates: 2900 (as of 4 November 2017)

Differences between elections and appointments
Elect (选举): Candidates are nominated by the Presidium or by the delegates. When voting to elect, delegates are allowed to vote for or against the candidate, or to abstain. If a delegate votes against the candidate, they can write in another person as a replacement, but if they abstain, this right is unavailable.
Appoint (决定任命): Candidates are nominated by an appointed person, such as President, who has just elected by the delegates. When voting to appoint, as with elections, delegates are allowed to vote for or against the candidate, or to abstain, but by contrast, they can't write in another person after voting against or abstaining.

Elections and appointments rules
Candidates for the Chairman, Vice-Chairmen, Secretary-General and other members of the Standing Committee of the National People's Congress, for the President and Vice-President of the People's Republic of China, for the Chairman of the Central Military Commission, for the President and Chief Justice of the Supreme People's Court and the Prosector-General of the Supreme People's Procuratorate shall be nominated by the Presidium which shall, after consultation among the various delegations, decide upon a formal list of candidates based on the opinion of the majority of deputies. The Premier and other members of the State Council and members of the Central Military Commission other than its Chairman shall be nominated in accordance with the relevant provisions of the Constitution. Candidates for the chairman, vice-chairmen and other members of the special committees shall be nominated by the Presidium from among the deputies.

Bills and proposals rules
When the National People's Congress is in session each year, the State Council shall submit to the session a report on the plan for national economic and social development and the implementation of the previous year's plan and a report on the state budget and the implementation of the previous year's state budget, and print for distribution at the session, together with the above reports, the main targets in the national economic and social development plan (draft), the tables of revenue and expenditure in the state budget (draft) and the tables showing the implementation of the previous year's state budget (draft), which shall be examined by the various delegations and also by the Financial and Economic Committee and the relevant special committees. The Financial and Economic Committee shall, in the light of the examination reports prepared by the various delegations and the relevant special committees, examine the report on the plan for national economic and social development and on the implementation of the previous year's plan, and the report on the state budget and the implementation of the previous year's state budget, and submit to the Presidium a report on the results of its examination. The Presidium shall, after deliberation and approval, print the report for distribution at the session; the Presidium shall also submit a draft resolution on the plan for national economic and social development and a draft resolution on the state budget and the implementation of the previous year's state budget to a plenary meeting of the session for the vote. Reports on the results of deliberation prepared by the relevant special committees shall be promptly printed and distributed at the session.

Constitutional Amendment

Elections and appointments

1993

1998

2003

2008

2013

2018

Bills and proposals

Work Reports of the Government

Reports of the National Economic and Social Development

Reports of the Central and Local Budgets

Work Reports of NPC Standing Committee

Work Reports of the Supreme People's Court

Work Reports of the Supreme People's Procuratorate

Laws

Five-year Plans

Reforms of departments of the State Council

Drafts of electing delegates for the next term

NPCSC Members' resignations

List of low approval rates
, there have been no votes that were rejected by the National People's Congress, but some events have received comparatively low approving rates. This list include reported events which received below 70%.

Standing Committee votes 
Despite the historical lack of resolution disapproval, there was one event in April 1999 where a bill was rejected by the National People's Congress Standing Committee. The bill was the Amendment Bill to the Highway Law which proposed to replace highway tolls with a fuel tax. The bill failed to be approved by a majority of members present, falling shy by just one vote. The amendment bill would eventually be passed later that year in October.

References

See also 

 Politics of China
 Elections in China
 National People's Congress

National People's Congress
National People's Congress, Voting